A crash program is a plan of action entailing rapid, intensive resource allocation to solve a pressing problem. Rapidity may eliminate investigation and planning essential to efficient use of resources when goals are perceived as more important than those resources.

Deadlines 
Time limits differentiate crash programs from normal procedures. Time reduction often results from unexpected circumstances. These time limits may originate from predictable events like weather cycles or financial deadlines, or they may be arbitrarily established as lifesaving measures in situations involving famine, disease, or military vulnerabilities. Schedule compression occurs when deadlines appropriate for expected conditions are shortened while the program is in progress.

Methods 
Fast-tracking involves working simultaneously on activities that would have been performed sequentially under normal circumstances. Project crashing occurs when additional resources are required to meet the established deadline. Project crashing increases the cost of the goal. Crash analysis compares the costs of shortened deadlines.

Examples 
 First transcontinental railroad
 Liberty ship
 Operation Bumblebee
 Space Race
 COVID-19 vaccine
 Manhattan Project

References 

Planning
Schedule (project management)